Juan Díes is the co-founder and executive director of Sones de Mexico Ensemble, a Chicago folk music group that specializes in the Mexican musical tradition known as son.  Sones de Mexico was nominated for a Latin Grammy in 2007. Díes has degrees from Earlham College and Indiana University. In 2020, the Illinois Arts Council awarded one of its Artist Fellowship Awards to Juan Díes.

References

Folk musicians from Chicago
Earlham College alumni
Indiana University alumni
Living people
Place of birth missing (living people)
Year of birth missing (living people)